Jean-Claude Milner (born 3 January 1941) is a linguist, philosopher and essayist. His specialist fields of endeavour are linguistics (which he studied with Roland Barthes) and psychoanalysis (through the teaching and friendship of Jacques Lacan). In 1971, Milner was at the Massachusetts Institute of Technology where he translated Noam Chomsky's Aspects of the Theory of Syntax into French. His work helped to establish the terminology of theory of syntax in the French school of generative grammar. Milner is now a professor at the University Paris Diderot and lives in Paris.

Life and work
Milner, who was born in Paris, is the son of a Lithuanian immigrant Jewish father and an Alsatian mother of the Protestant faith. 
After studies in a second year preparatory class for the humanities during high school, Milner studied at both École Normale Supérieure and at the Massachusetts Institute of Technology. His education was shaped by the thought and teaching of Louis Althusser and Jacques Lacan. Lacan's influence may also be tied to his friendship with Jacques-Alain Miller during these early years. Miller became, subsequently, the son-in-law of Lacan. Both Miller and Milner attended Lacan's seminars held at the ENS and their friendship was instrumental in the founding and direction of the Cahiers pour l’Analyse several years later.

From 1968 to 1971, Milner was affiliated with the Maoist movement of the proletarian Left and discovered the path of his own political evolution. Milner seems to have disavowed, or moved away from, these early affiliations. Alain Badiou, who has remained steadfast in his Maoist affiliations, has engaged in a long-standing contretemps with Milner over these changing affiliations (and many other differences, including accusing Badiou of Anti-Semitism). Milner also received training and education from Roland Barthes and made a close reading of Roman Jakobson.

After his initial association with Chomsky's linguistic theories, Milner's work took a different turn. He published Introduction to a Science of Language (1989) which melds a general linguistics theory, that rests on a radical separation between sense and syntax (theory of syntactic positions) together with an epistemology that combines concepts of Karl Popper and Imre Lakatos. This work tackles a key epistemological problem of the scientific status of Lacan's theories. Milner also follows developments of Chomskyian theory though he does not adhere to the hypothesis of a biological justification for it which Chomsky defended.

Milner's later work, such as the English publication of For the Love of Language, has been called,
"a path-breaking reflection on the consequences of Lacan's theory for the study of language".

Since 2000, particularly in France, Milner has been recognised for his essays concerning anti-Semitism in European history and culture. For several years, he has held a seminar devoted to this theme at the Institut d’études levinassiennes in Paris.

In 2010, Milner became Professor Emeritus of Linguistics at the Université de Paris VII.

Selected publications

English 
 For The Love of Language, translated and introduced by Ann Banfield. Basingstoke: Palgrave-Macmillan, 1990. 
 "The Doctrine of Science", translated by Oliver Feltham. Umbr(a): A Journal of the Unconscious, Science, and Truth. (2000), pp. 33–63. This is the second chapter of Milner's L’Œuvre claire : Lacan, la science, et la philosophie.
Slavoj Žižek (Ed.). Jacques Lacan: Critical Evaluations in Cultural Theory (4 Volumes). Volume One contains "The Doctrine of Science" (see above). Volume Two contains "Extracts from For The Love of Language", which is Chapters 5, 6, & 7 of For The Love of Language, pp. 98–127.
 "The Prince and the Revolutionary", Crisis and Critique, volume 3, issue 1 (2016), pp. 71–78
 "The Tell-Tale Constellations", translated by Christian R. Gelder. S: Journal for the Circle of Lacanian Ideology Critique. (2016), pp. 31-38.

Translations into French 
 Noam Chomsky : Aspects de la theorie syntaxique, Paris: Éditions du Seuil, 1971.

Books 
 Arguments linguistiques, Mame, 1973
 De la syntaxe à l’interprétation. Quantités, insultes, exclamations, Le Seuil, collection « Travaux linguistiques », 1978
 L’Amour de la langue, Le Seuil, collection « Connexions du Champ freudien », 1978
 Ordres et raisons de langue, Le Seuil, 1982
 Les Noms indistincts, Le Seuil, collection « Connexions du Champ freudien », 1983
 De l’école, le Seuil, 1984
 De l'inutilité des arbres en linguistique, Département de Recherches Linguistiques, Un. de Paris VII, coll. ERA  642, 1985
 Détections fictives, Le Seuil, collection « Fictions & Cie », 1985
 Introduction à un traitement du passif, Département de Recherches Linguistiques, Un. de Paris VII, coll. ERA  642, 1986 (rééd.)
 Dire le vers, (en collaboration avec François Regnault), Le Seuil, 1987
 Introduction à une science du langage, Le Seuil, collection « Travaux linguistiques », 1989
 Constat, 1992
 Archéologie d’un échec : 1950-1993, Le Seuil, 1993
 L’Œuvre claire : Lacan, la science et la philosophie, Le Seuil, collection « L’Ordre philosophique », 1995
 « Les Dénis », dans Paroles à la bouche du présent. Le négationnisme, histoire ou politique ?, sous la direction de Natacha Michel, Éd. Al Dante, 1997
 Le Salaire de l’idéal, Le Seuil, 1997
 Le Triple du plaisir, Verdier, 1997
 Mallarmé au tombeau, Verdier, 1999
 Les penchants criminels de l'Europe démocratique, Verdier, 2003
 Existe-t-il une vie intellectuelle en France ?, Verdier, 2002
 Le Périple structural, Figures et paradigmes, Le Seuil, collection « La couleur des idées », 2002
 Constats, Gallimard, coll. Folio/Essais. (rassemble Constat, Le triple du plaisir, Mallarmé au tombeau)
 Le Pas philosophique de Roland Barthes, Verdier, 2003
 La politique des choses, Navarin éditeur, 2005
 Le Juif de savoir, Grasset, 2007
 L'arrogance du présent. Regards sur une décennie, 1965-1975, Grasset, 2009

References

External links 
 Jean-Claude Milner's Homepage at The Cahiers pour l'Analyse and Contemporary French Thought (website is in English)
 Jean-Claude Milner on the site of editions Greenfinch
 Interviews of Jean-Claude Milner
 "A very tense language", article of Philippe Lançon appeared in "Libération"

Writers from Paris
1941 births
Living people
Lycée Henri-IV alumni
École Normale Supérieure alumni
Massachusetts Institute of Technology alumni
20th-century French philosophers
21st-century French philosophers
French people of Lithuanian-Jewish descent
Linguists from France
Jacques Lacan
French Maoists